Daniel Tunes Dantas (born 28 June 1954) is a Brazilian actor. In 1999, he won the Best Actor award at the Festival de Recife for his role in Traição. He is the son of actor Nelson Dantas.

Partial filmography

 Tudo Bem (1978) as José Roberto's friend
 Chega Mais (1980, TV Series) as Tatá
 Engraçadinha (1981) as Zózimo
 O Sonho Não Acabou (1982) as João Carlos
 Fonte da Saudade (1985)
 Sinhá Moça (1986, TV Series) as Ricardo Fontes
 Sonho de Valsa (1987)
 Brasileiras e Brasileiros (1990-1991, TV Series) as Orlando
 O Dono do Mundo (1991, TV Series) as Júlio
 Mulheres de Areia (1993, TV Series) as Breno Soares de Azevedo
 Quatro por Quatro (1994-1995, TV Series) as Celso
 The Interview (1995) as Editor do Brasilian Tribune
 Explode Coração (1995, TV Series) as Tadeu
 Pequeno Dicionário Amoroso (1997) as Gabriel
 O Homem Nu (1997) as Mendonça
 Anjo Mau (1997-1998, TV Series) as Tadeu Fachini
 Traição (1998) as Geraldo
 Força de um Desejo (1999, TV Series) as Bartolomeu
 Cronicamente Inviável (2000) as Carlos
 Coração Brasileiro (2000) as Jonas
 Sabor da Paixão (2002, TV Series) as Edgar Reis
 Lost Zweig (2002) as Lauro Pontes
 O Vestido (2003) as Fausto
 Celebridade (2003-2004, TV Series) as Ademar Sampaio
 Os Aspones (2004, TV Series)
 Começar de Novo (2004, TV Series) as Wagner
 Mandrake (2005, TV Series) as Baby Machado
 Caixa Dois (2007) as Roberto
 Paraíso Tropical (2007, TV Series) as Heitor
 Forasters (2008) as Alí
 Os Normais 2: A Noite Mais Maluca de Todas (2009) as Iurinei
 Sonhos Roubados (2009) as Tio Peri
 Histórias de Amor Duram Apenas 90 Minutos (2009) as Humberto
 Eu e Meu Guarda-Chuva (2010) as Barão Von Staffen
 Cheias de Charme (2012, TV Series) as Sidney Monteiro
 Sangue Bom (2013, TV Series) as Gilson Rabelo
 Getúlio (2014) as Deputado Afonso Arinos
 Boogie Oogie (2014-2015, TV Series) as Elísio Miranda Romão
 Pequeno Dicionário Amoroso 2 (2015) as Gabriel
 BR 716 (2016) as Felipe's father
 O Amor no Divã (2016) as José
 Novo Mundo (2017, TV Series) as Olinto
 Rúcula com Tomate Seco (2017) as Dr. Marcos Antônio
 Malhação: Vidas Brasileiras (2018-2019, TV Series) as Jairo Kavaco

References

External links

1954 births
Living people
Male actors from Rio de Janeiro (city)
Brazilian male film actors
Brazilian male television actors
Brazilian people of American descent
Brazilian people of Spanish descent
Portuguese people of Brazilian descent